Theodor Christian Petersen Haagaas (15 June 1873, Tistedalen – 25 December 1961, Oslo) was a Norwegian mathematician and private school owner. He was a co-owner of Frogner School and Nissen's Girls' School (1913–1918) and founder, owner and headmaster of the Haagaas School, a private gymnasium at Frogner, Oslo that existed 1915–1955. He is also known for the widely used Haffner og Haagaas series of textbooks in mathematics, which was published between 1925 and 1979 in numerous editions. He received the King's Medal of Merit in Gold in 1949.

Background

He grew up in Tistedalen outside Frederikshald, where his father Theodor Christian Haagaas (1823–1899) was the managing director (1862–1892) of the sawmills of Saugbrugsforeningen, Norway's largest timber company. His father lived at Veden Manor in Tistedalen. Theodor Haagaas was one of the pioneers of skiing in Tistedalen around 1885–1886. He was the father of four daughters, among them Henriette Bie Lorentzen.

Career

He attended the Frederikshald Gymnasium and graduated with the examen artium university entrance exam in 1891. He subsequently studied philosophy and natural sciences at the Royal Frederick University. He also served in the Royal Norwegian Navy 1897–1902 as a deputy intendant (lieutenant in the logistics officer corps).

He was employed as a lecturer in mathematics at the private gymnasium Frogner School in Oslo in 1900, and was a co-owner of both Frogner School and its neighbour, the Nissen's Girls' School, from 1913 to 1918. He was the founder, owner and headmaster of the Haagaas School, a private gymnasium in Oslo that existed from 1915 to 1955. Haagaas School was the last school in Norway in the tradition of the Heltberg School of the 19th century, offering a fast track to the examen artium (a so-called studentfabrikk, "student factory"), and was described by Mosse Jørgensen as "the new Heltberg [school]." According to his former pupil Harald Throne-Holst, Haagaas was characterized by a "strong and active sense of humor."

He was a co-author and subsequently the sole author of the Haffner og Haagaas series of textbooks in mathematics, which was published between 1925 and 1979 in numerous editions. Upon his death he was described by Aftenposten as one of the most well known Norwegian educators in his lifetime.

Honours
King's Medal of Merit in Gold, 1949

References

1873 births
1961 deaths
Heads of schools in Norway
Recipients of the King's Medal of Merit in gold
University of Oslo alumni
Royal Norwegian Navy personnel
People from Halden
Scientists from Oslo
Norwegian people of Swedish descent
Burials at Vestre gravlund
Schoolteachers from Oslo